The 2022–23 Aberdeen F.C. season is Aberdeen's 109th season in the top flight of Scottish football and its tenth in the Scottish Premiership. Aberdeen are also competing in the League Cup and the Scottish Cup.

Summary

May 
Jim Goodwin began his first full season as manager. For the first time since its reintroduction, Aberdeen entered the group stages of the League Cup. They were drawn in Group A to face Raith Rovers, Peterhead, Dumbarton and Stirling Albion.

June 
Aberdeen spent a week at a Spanish resort for a pre-season training camp. On 19 June, Calvin Ramsay was sold to Liverpool for an initial fee of £4.2 million, with £2.5 million add-ons and a 17.5% sell on fee which became a new club-record sale. June proved to be the start of a busy summer for new arrivals too. Albanian international midfielder Ylber Ramadani and Macedonian striker Bojan Miovski both joined the Dons from Hungarian Premier League side MTK Budapest for fees in the region of £100,000 and £535,000 respectively. Jim Goodwin bolstered the defence by signing right back Jayden Richardson from Nottingham Forest and landing Liam Scales on a season-long loan from Scottish champions Celtic.

July 
On 8 July, manager Jim Goodwin announced new signing Anthony Stewart would serve as the club's captain, taking over from Joe Lewis, with Ross McCrorie serving as vice captain. On 9 July, former player Davie Robb died at the age of 74. On 12 July, Lewis Ferguson signed for Serie A side Bologna for a reported £3 million. Aberdeen topped Group A in the Scottish League Cup winning all four games against Raith Rovers, Peterhead, Dumbarton and Stirling Albion. The Dons qualified as a seeded team in the second round and were drawn away to Scottish League Two side Annan Athletic. On the opening day of the 2022–23 season Aberdeen lost 2–0 away to reigning league champions Celtic in Glasgow.

August 
On 6 August Aberdeen recorded their first league win of the campaign beating St Mirren 4–1. On the same day Leighton Clarkson joined on a season-long loan from English side Liverpool and scored on his debut. A defeat at home to Motherwell in Steven Hammell's first game in charge of the Lanarkshire side followed. But wins away to St Johnstone and at home to Livingston lifted Aberdeen to fifth place in the league at the end of August. On 30 August Aberdeen needed extra time to overcome Scottish League Two opponents Annan Athletic in the second round of the Scottish League Cup. The following day Aberdeen were drawn to play Partick Thistle at home in the quarter finals of the competition. The club announced that Dougie Bell, Russell Anderson and the late Davie Robb would be inducted into the Aberdeen FC Hall of Fame.

September 
On 3 September, Aberdeen drew 1–1 away with Ross County, with Duk put Aberdeen ahead in the 88th minute, but Ross County scored an equaliser after five minutes of injury time. Leighton Clarkson was suspended for two matches, following a challenge on Ross County defender Callum Johnson. The match against Rangers at Pittodrie, scheduled for 10 September, was postponed due to the death of Queen Elizabeth II. Aberdeen's next match was away to Hibernian, on 17 September. Aberdeen took an early lead from a Duk header, but eventually lost 3-1 after Hibernian were awarded a controversial penalty and Liam Scales was sent off for a second yellow card for a foul on Hibernian defender, Ryan Porteous. Scales was suspended for one match. Aberdeen manager, Jim Goodwin accused Porteous of "blatant cheating" during a post-match interview and he was later handed an eight-match touchline ban by the SFA for these comments. No other matches were played in September due to the international break. Bojan Miovski and Ylber Ramadani made appearances for North Macedonia and Albania in the UEFA Nations League while Duk was capped for Cape Verde in a friendly against Bahrain. At the end of the month the club announced that former striker Frank McDougall would be inducted into the Aberdeen FC Hall of Fame.

October 
Aberdeen started the month with a 4–1 win at home against Kilmarnock, on the first visit to Pittodrie of former manager Derek McInnes, since leaving the club in March 2021. On 1 October, former Aberdeen striker Frank McDougall announced that he has been diagnosed with lung cancer. A week later Aberdeen travelled to Tannadice to play bottom of the table Dundee United and lost 4-0  in a fixture which was played at 18:00 instead of 15:00 (BST) at the request of both clubs. On 16 October Aberdeen bounced back from the previous defeat by beating Hearts 2-0 thanks to two late goals from Duk and Vicente Besuijen. On 19 October Hayden Coulson scored his first goal for Aberdeen as the Dons swept aside Partick Thistle 4-1  at home to reach the League Cup semi-final. Later that same evening Aberdeen were drawn to face rivals Rangers in the semi finals at Hampden in the New Year  Four days later Aberdeen recorded only their second away league win of the season. Goals from Bojan Miovski and Duk saw the Dons run out 2-1 winners against Motherwell at Fir Park. It was the first weekend of VAR being used in the Scottish Premiership. Miovski's goal had initially been ruled offside, but the decision was overturned by VAR and the goal stood. Aberdeen's final game in October was away to Rangers at Ibrox. Connor Barron opened the scoring, but the Dons ended up losing the match 4–1. On 31 October manager Goodwin had his touchline ban reduced from eight games to three games - with one being served earlier in the month against Dundee United.

November 

VAR made its debut at Pittodrie on 4 November as Aberdeen entertained Hibernian at the slightly unusual time of a Friday night match. VAR was heavily involved in Aberdeen's opening goal as goalkeeper David Marshall was judged to have brought down Duk in the penalty box at the end of the first half. Bojan Miovski missed the penalty, however VAR intervened again after Marshall encroached beyond the goal line and Miovski made no mistake as the spot kick was retaken. The Macedonian striker headed a second, as Ylber Ramadani scored his first goal for the Dons and Leighton Clarkson sealed a 4–1 win. Aberdeen's dismal away form continued in the next match against Livingston - a game which was filled with more VAR incidents. Defender Jack Fitzwater put Livi ahead early then Sean Kelly doubled the lead from the spot after Connor Barron was adjudged to have handled the ball in the box. The Dons were awarded two penalties either side of half-time - Miovski saw his effort saved, but Duk converted a second-half spot kick. Aberdeen lost the game 2–1. On 10 November defender Liam Scales was called up to the Republic of Ireland squad ahead of friendlies against Malta and Norway. Other Dons players called up for November international duty included Albanian midfielder Ramadani for friendlies against Italy and Armenia and Miovski was included in North Macedonia's squad for friendlies against Finland and Azerbaijan. Before the international break, another converted penalty by Miovski took him to the top of the Scottish Premiership scorer charts as Aberdeen saw off Dundee United at Pittodrie on 12 November. The league paused for five weeks due to the 2022 FIFA World Cup taking place in Qatar. The rest of the Aberdeen squad travelled to Atlanta in the USA for a week-long training camp and played a friendly against Atlanta United. On 28 November Aberdeen were drawn in the Fourth round of the Scottish Cup to face West of Scotland Football League side Darvel away in Ayrshire.

December 

Aberdeen returned to league action on 17 December with a home defeat to Celtic - Callum McGregor scored the only goal of the game as the champions dominated Aberdeen in a game where Goodwin was criticised for his ultra defensive tactics. Three days later against rivals Rangers goals from Duk and Leighton Clarkson cancelled out Fashion Sakala's opener, but the Dons squandered the 2–1 lead as Scott Arfield scored two injury time goals to give Rangers all three points. On Christmas Eve, captain Anthony Stewart became the first Aberdeen player to be shown a straight red card as he was sent off in a 3–1 defeat away to St Mirren. Before the New Year Aberdeen slipped to a fourth successive loss going down 2–1 away to Kilmarnock. Midfielder Matty Kennedy scored a stoppage time free-kick which proved to be a mere consolation as the Dons struggled to recover from Scott Robinson and Joe Wright's first half goals.

January 

Aberdeen started the New Year with a goalless draw at home to bottom of the table Ross County. The club confirmed a number of updates to development squad loanees. Mason Hancock was recalled from his spell at Arbroath as a result of a serious knee injury. Kevin Hanratty also returned to Cormack Park after his loan spell with Forfar Athletic ended. Youngster Aaron Reid officially became an Aberdeen player after completing his move from Turriff United and the striker was immediately loaned out to Elgin City F.C. for the remainder of the campaign. Finally, Kieran Ngwenya’s stay at Raith Rovers was extended until the end of the season. On 5 January former captain Graeme Shinnie re-joined the club on a six-month loan deal from English Championship side Wigan Athletic. Hours later, Aberdeen announced the loan signing of Slovakian midfielder Patrik Myslovič from Slovak Super Liga club MŠK Žilina. Shinnie made his second Dons debut in win at home to St Johnstone - a brace from Duk sealed the 2–0 victory and kept Aberdeen fourth in the table.  On 11 January, youngster Evan Towler was recalled from his loan at Scottish Championship side Cove Rangers and was immediately sent out on loan to Elgin City until the end of the season. Aberdeen travelled to Hampden to take on Rangers in the Viaplay League Cup semi-final. Bojan Miovski scored just before half-time to give Aberdeen the lead, but former captain Ryan Jack equalised and sent the tie into extra time. Kemar Roofe scored the winner for Rangers as Aberdeen finished the game with ten men. Current captain Anthony Stewart received his second straight red card of the season for a reckless tackle on Fashion Sakala. Pressure on Jim Goodwin's tenure as Aberdeen manager reached now levels as the Dons slumped to a 5-0 defeat to Hearts at Tynecastle on 18 January, but worse was to come. In what has since been regarded as one of the - if not the - greatest shocks in Scottish Cup history, Aberdeen lost 1-0 away to West of Scotland Football League junior side Darvel in a game which was broadcast on BBC Scotland. The club waited nearly 48 hours after the result to release a statement backing Goodwin - but raising expectations for an "immediate response" from the management and players to turn results around. Goodwin's short reign came to an end on 28 January as Aberdeen suffered another humiliating defeat in Edinburgh. Josh Campbell scored a hat-trick in a thumping 6-0 win for Hibernian - a game which saw Liam Scales sent off for a second time at Easter Road. Nineteen minutes after the final whistle Goodwin was formally relived of his duties  and chairman Dave Cormack gave an emotional interview to journalists vowing to put things right. On 29 January former player Barry Robson was put in interim charge of the first team as the club appointed veteran English coach Scott Agnew to help him. On the same day Watford defender Mattie Pollock signed on loan for the rest of the season. On transfer deadline day Aberdeen bolstered their goalkeeping options by signing Jay Gorter from Dutch giants Ajax and the club also landed the signature of experienced centre back Angus MacDonald on a free transfer following his release from Swindon Town in the EFL League Two. Blackburn Rovers winger Dilan Markanday also signed on loan until the end of the season. In the opposite direction, captain Anthony Stewart sealed a loan move to EFL League One side MK Dons and winger Vicente Besuijen joined Eredivisie side Excelsior Rotterdam also until the end of the season but with an option to buy.

February 

Ahead of his first game as interim manager against St. Mirren on 1 February, Barry Robson handed the captaincy to Graeme Shinnie. Debuts were also handed to three signings - Angus MacDonald, Dilan Markanday and Mattie Pollock - who joined the Dons on transfer deadline day However, within the opening spells of the game Aberdeen were reduced to ten men following a VAR check after Ross McCrorie was adjudged to have elbowed Charles Dunne. Former Dons Curtis Main and Declan Gallagher scored as the visitors ran out 3-1 winners. But, Robson did get a win under his belt at home to struggler Motherwell four days later. Dutch goalkeeper Jay Gorter was given his debut as Duk headed the opener in the first half and Bojan Miovski netted a brace in the second half to give Aberdeen the win.

Results & fixtures

Pre-season

Scottish Premiership

Scottish League Cup 

For the first time since its reintroduction, Aberdeen entered the Group Stages of the League Cup. They were drawn in Group A to face Raith Rovers, Peterhead, Dumbarton and Stirling Albion.

Group A

Knockout phase

Scottish Cup

Squad statistics

Appearances 

|-
|colspan="17"|Players who left the club during the season
|-

|}

Goalscorers 
As of 18 March 2023

Disciplinary record 
Includes all competitive matches.
Last updated 1 February 2023

Team statistics

League table

Results by round

Transfers

Players in

Players out

Loans in

Loans out

See also 
 List of Aberdeen F.C. seasons

References 

2022-23
Scottish football clubs 2022–23 season